The Yangulbaev case is a socio-political scandal that erupted in Russia in early 2022. Lawyer of the Committee for the Prevention of Torture Abubakar Yangulbaev announced the disappearance of several dozen of his relatives in Chechnya. After that, the Chechen security forces forcibly took his mother Zarema Musayeva (wife of a retired federal judge) from Nizhny Novgorod to Grozny, where she became a defendant in a criminal case and was sent to a pre-trial detention center.  Abubakar's brother, Ibragim, was put on the federal wanted list, his father and sister hastily left Russia. The head of Chechnya, Ramzan Kadyrov, said that members of the Yangulbaev family should be detained and punished, “and if they resist, then they should be destroyed as accomplices of terrorists”; he later demanded from foreign governments that the fugitives be returned to Chechnya.

On February 2, 2022, a rally was held in Grozny, the participants of which burned and trampled on the portraits of the Yangulbaevs;  according to official figures, there were about 400,000 protesters.
 
The European Union called on the Russian authorities to immediately release Musaeva.

Background
The eldest son of the judge, Abubakar, became a human rights activist and lawyer for the Committee for the Prevention of Torture. He regularly made sharp statements about the leadership of Chechnya, about the persecution to which his family was subjected. He was suspected of running the opposition telegram channel 1ADAT, and in 2020 Abubakar's house was searched, but this had no consequences. The whereabouts of Saydi Yangulbaev and his daughter are unknown. Zarema Musaeva, Saydi's wife, is in a pre-trial detention center until April 1, 2022.

References

2022 in Russia
Human rights in Russia
Human rights in Chechnya
Political scandals in Russia
Ramzan Kadyrov